Francisco Javier García Pimienta (born 3 August 1974), known as García Pimienta, is a Spanish football manager and former player. He is the current manager of UD Las Palmas.

A left winger, García Pimienta made his senior debut with Barcelona's C-team, and later represented the reserves before making his first team debut in 1997. He featured in a further four La Liga matches with CF Extremadura, and subsequently went on to resume his career in the lower leagues. As a coach, he worked for Barça for twenty years, being named in charge of the B-side in 2018 but being dismissed in 2021.

Club career
Born in Barcelona, Catalonia, García Pimienta joined FC Barcelona's youth setup in 1986. After making his senior debut for the C-side in Tercera División, he first played as a professional with the reserves in Segunda División.

García Pimienta made his first team – and La Liga – debut on 26 May 1996, starting in a 2–2 away draw against Deportivo de La Coruña. On 14 July, he was loaned to fellow top tier side CF Extremadura for one year, but appeared rarely after suffering a serious injury which kept him out for the majority of the campaign.

Upon returning, García Pimienta was assigned back to the B-team, achieving promotion from Segunda División B. After a four-month loan at fellow league team UE Figueres, he moved to CE L'Hospitalet in a permanent basis.

García Pimienta retired in 2004 at the age of 29, after playing for UE Sant Andreu.

Managerial career
In 2001, while still a player, García Pimienta was the assistant of Álex García at Barcelona's Cadete squad. He left the club in 2003, only returning three years later now as manager of the very same category.

After progressing through the youth setup, García Pimienta was named Gerard López's assistant at the B-side on 21 July 2015. On 25 October 2017, he replaced Gabri at the helm of the Juvenil A squad.

After winning the 2017–18 UEFA Youth League, García Pimienta was appointed at the helm of the reserves on 25 April 2018, after the sacking of Gerard. His debut in senior coaching was three days later, a 1–0 loss at UD Almería in the second division as his team ended the season relegated.

In three full seasons in charge of Barcelona B in the third tier, García Pimienta made the playoffs in the latter two campaigns, losing the 2020 final 2–1 to neighbours CE Sabadell FC, and the semi-final on penalties to UCAM Murcia CF a year later. On 11 June 2021, following the latter defeat, he was dismissed after the club terminated his contract.

On 24 January 2022, García Pimienta was named manager of UD Las Palmas in the second division, replacing Pepe Mel at a team in eighth place and three points off the playoffs. Having fallen to 14th after a poor start, he led them to an 11-game unbeaten run with nine victories to reach fourth place and a post-season berth, where they were eliminated in the semi-finals by Canary Islands rivals CD Tenerife. By the anniversary of his appointment, he had taken 63% of the available points from 42 league games.

Managerial statistics

Honours

Manager
Barcelona
UEFA Youth League: 2017–18

References

External links

1974 births
Living people
Footballers from Barcelona
Spanish footballers
Association football wingers
La Liga players
Segunda División players
Segunda División B players
Tercera División players
FC Barcelona C players
FC Barcelona Atlètic players
FC Barcelona players
CF Extremadura footballers
UE Figueres footballers
CE L'Hospitalet players
UE Sant Andreu footballers
Spain youth international footballers
Spanish football managers
Segunda División managers
Segunda División B managers
FC Barcelona non-playing staff
FC Barcelona Atlètic managers
UD Las Palmas managers